HMS Venus was a V-class destroyer of the Royal Navy that saw service during the Second World War. She was built by Fairfield Shipbuilding and Engineering Company, of Govan, Scotland and launched on 23 February 1943.

Service history

Second World War service
She was part of the escorting destroyers of the 21st Aircraft Carrier Squadron involved in Operation Dracula from April to May 1945.

Post war service
Between 1946 and 1949 Venus was part of the 3rd Destroyer Flotilla, based in the Mediterranean. This included work as part of the Royal Navy patrols preventing illegal Jewish immigration into Mandatory Palestine. In June 1946 she intercepted Josiah Wedgewood.

On 2 August 1946 the British oil tanker  exploded, burned and sank in Haifa Roads, Palestine, killing 25 people. Virago and Venus took part in the rescue of survivors. Venus and Virago had been dropping depth charges in the area to deter Haganah frogmen from planting limpet mines.

Between 1949 and 1951 she was held in reserve at Devonport Dockyard. Between 1951 and 1952 she was converted at Devonport into a Type 15 fast anti-submarine frigate, with the new pennant number F50. Following conversion she became leader of the 6th Frigate Squadron. In 1953 she took part in the Fleet Review to celebrate the Coronation of Queen Elizabeth II. In 1955 she was refitted for work as part of the Dartmouth Training Squadron.

Decommissioning and disposal
In 1964 Venus went to reserve and in October 1969 was in use as a target to measure the effects of ship to ship use of the Sea Dart missile system. She was sold to Thos. W. Ward for scrapping and arrived at their Briton Ferry yard on 20 December 1972 to be broken up.

References

Publications
 
 
 

 

U and V-class destroyers of the Royal Navy
Ships built in Govan
1943 ships
World War II destroyers of the United Kingdom
Cold War destroyers of the United Kingdom
Type 15 frigates
Cold War frigates of the United Kingdom